Oscar Blansaer (13 November 1890 – 23 June 1962) was a Belgian long-distance runner. He competed in the marathon at the 1920 Summer Olympics. He was also the runner-up in 5000 metres at the 1912 Flanders championships.

References

1890 births
1962 deaths
Athletes (track and field) at the 1920 Summer Olympics
Belgian male long-distance runners
Belgian male marathon runners
Olympic athletes of Belgium